"Namárië" is a poem by J. R. R. Tolkien written in one of his constructed languages, Quenya, and published in The Lord of the Rings. It is subtitled "Galadriel's Lament in Lórien", which in Quenya is Altariello nainië Lóriendessë. The poem appears, too, in a book of musical settings by Donald Swann of songs from Middle-earth, The Road Goes Ever On; the Gregorian plainsong-like melody was hummed to Swann by Tolkien. The poem is the longest Quenya text in The Lord of the Rings and also one of the longest continuous texts in Quenya that Tolkien ever wrote. An English translation is provided in the book.

"Namárië" has been set to music by The Tolkien Ensemble, by the Finnish composer  for a theatre production, and by the Spanish band . Part of the poem is sung by a female chorus in a scene of Peter Jackson's The Fellowship of the Ring to music by Howard Shore.

Poem 

The poem starts and ends as follows: 

Tolkien provided a guide to how to pronounce and intone the poem in the book of his songs, The Road Goes Ever On, which contains a setting of the poem to music, and a recording on CD, by Donald Swann. The text there is accompanied by "a literal translation", on which Tolkien comments that the version in The Fellowship of the Ring is "sufficiently accurate".

Settings

Donald Swann 

Namárië was set to music by Donald Swann with Tolkien's help: Swann proposed a setting, but Tolkien replied that he had a different setting in mind, and hummed a Gregorian chant. Swann took this up, feeling that it worked perfectly with the poem, commenting: 

The sheet music and an audio recording are in their 1967 book The Road Goes Ever On. The setting is in the key of A major and in  time. A separate recording survives of Tolkien singing the poem to a Gregorian chant. Gill Gleeson, writing in Mallorn, states that it has the quality of an "improvisatory plainsong for voice and (melodic) instrument, a self-contained unharmonised melody." She describes it as "finely balanced in proportion, and held in tension between two modal scales", with the reciting-note C# as a "pivot". She likens the instrumental mode to a "descending melodic minor scale" in F#, with the vocal mode in A major.

The Tolkien Ensemble 

Between 1997 and 2005, the Danish Tolkien Ensemble published four CDs featuring every poem from The Lord of the Rings, amongst them two versions of "Namárië", both composed by the ensemble leader Caspar Reiff. The first, sung by the Danish Mezzo-soprano Signe Asmussen, sets the original Quenya text to music; the second version features the English translation spoken by the actor Christopher Lee (who played Saruman in the movies).

Howard Shore 

In his music for The Lord of the Rings film series, composed between 2000 and 2004 to support Peter Jackson's film trilogy, Howard Shore made use of part of Namárië. The scene "The  Fighting Uruk-hai" is accompanied, non-diegetically, by a female chorus singing the poem in Quenya, over images of the Elf-lady Galadriel gazing at the remaining eight members of the Fellowship of the Ring as they leave Lothlórien.

Other composers 

In 2001, the Finnish composer  wrote a setting of the poem for the musical Sagan om Ringen ("The Lord of the Rings") at the Swedish Theatre, Helsinki.
In 2008, the Spanish neoclassical dark wave band  published a studio album called Namárië. Among other Tolkien-inspired songs it features a track Namárië: El Llanto de Galadriel ("Namárië: Galadriel's Lament"). Kogaionon magazine called it a mature and complex album "with a medieval and ... forceful aura".

Analysis 

As the longest text in the Elvish language Quenya that Tolkien provided in The Lord of the Rings or elsewhere, Namárië has attracted the attention of linguists. Helge Fauskanger has made a word-by-word analysis of the text, noting that the version in The Road Goes Ever On is "nearly" identical to that in the novel: Tolkien added accent marks to indicate stronger and weaker stresses to guide the singer. Fauskanger describes the language used in the poem as the "Late Exilic" or "Third Age" variant of Quenya. Fauskanger comments that while "Valimar", named in the poem, normally denotes the city of the Valar, the poem uses it to mean the whole of Valinor, the blessed realm. The philologist Allan Turner states that Tolkien meant the poem to embody the Elvish culture from the deep past that Galadriel remembers. The poem does not rhyme or scan conventionally; Jonathan McColl, writing in Mallorn, comments that while he prefers poems which use those devices, he finds "even ... the translation" of Namárië poetic, while the original Quenya with its Gregorian setting is "lovely".

The Quenya word namárië is a reduced form of á na márië, meaning literally "be well", an Elvish formula used for greeting and for farewell. The earliest version of the poem was published posthumously in The Treason of Isengard. Tolkien did not provide a translation of that version, and some of the words used differ in form from those in the version that appeared in The Lord of the Rings.

Adaptations 

The band Led Zeppelin adapted the first line of "Namárië" for the opening of their 1969 song "Ramble On" on their studio album Led Zeppelin II. The English line "Leaves are falling all around" represents Tolkien's "Ah! like gold fall the leaves in the wind". Further references to Tolkien's writing appear in the rest of the song, which mentions Gollum and Mordor.

Notes

References

Primary 
This list identifies each item's location in Tolkien's writings.

Secondary

Sources

External links 

 Tolkien reciting Namárië
 The Donald Swann version
 Tengwar, Quenya, and English parallel texts on Glaemscrafu
 The Ilúvamil version

1954 poems
Middle-earth poetry
Greeting words and phrases
Words originating in fiction
Poems in The Lord of the Rings